Hayes van der Berg (born 8 December 1994) is a South African first-class cricketer. He is a right-handed batsman and a right-arm fast medium bowler. He made his First Class debut for Western Province against Border.

References

External links
 

1994 births
Living people
South African cricketers
Western Province cricketers